Marand (also Romanized as Morand) is a city in the Central District of Marand County, East Azerbaijan province, Iran, and serves as capital of the county. At the 2006 census, its population was 114,165 in 29,755 households. The following census in 2011 counted 124,323 people in 35,805 households. The latest census in 2016 showed a population of 130,825 people in 40,275 households.

Marand is among the major cities of East Azerbaijan province. It is in the northwest of the capital of the province, Tabriz. Marand has been known by various names in history, such as Maryana, Mandagarana, and Maranda.

Etymology
Moritz von Kotzebue and August von Haxthausen both described local legends that placed the burial spot of Noah's wife at Marand.  Both authors contended that the name of the city means "the mother lies here," referring to Noah's wife.  According to Kotzebue:

History
The history of the town goes back to the pre-Islamic era.  Between 815 till 850, Marand was primarily controlled by Mohammad ibn Ba'ith who was Iranicized to a considerable extent.  The elders of Maragha who quoted his Persian poetry also praised his bravery and his literary ability.  He was Iranicized to considerable extent and the statement of Tabari on him is evidence of the existence of the cultivation of poetry in Persian in northwest Persia at the beginning of the 9th century.

Notable people 
For a complete list see: :Category:People from Marand
 Ganjali Sabahi (1909-1990) - Writer
 Aboutaleb Talebi (born 1945) - wrestler
 Musa Kalantari (1949-1981) - politician
 Jalil Farjad (born 1951) - Theatre and film actor
 Gholamreza Shafeei (born 1951) - politician
 Isa Kalantari (born 1952) - politician
 Mohammad-Taghi Pourmohammadi (born 1956) - cleric
 Shirin Bina (born 1964) - Theatre and film actor
 Meysam Naghizadeh (born 1986) - football player
 Mohsen Delir (born 1988) - football player

See also
 Marand Khanate

References 

Marand County

Cities in East Azerbaijan Province

Populated places in East Azerbaijan Province

Populated places in Marand County